Walter Jesse Jackson (16 March 1870 – 1 December 1958) was an English rugby union and professional rugby league footballer who played in the 1890s. He played representative level rugby union (RU) for the British Isles, and England, and at club level for Gloucester, and Halifax, as a forward, or wing, and club level rugby league (RL) for Halifax (Heritage No. 9), as a forward.

Rugby career
Jackson was born in Gloucester, Gloucestershire, and he died aged 88 in Halifax, West Riding of Yorkshire.

Rugby career
Jackson first came to note as a rugby player while representing Gloucester. In 1891 Jackson accepted an invitation to join the British Isles on their tour to South Africa, the first official tour by the team that later became the British Lions. It is unknown if Jackson joined the tour party late, was unwell or just not chosen to play, but he missed the first four matches of the tour, not playing until the team faced Griqualand West at Kimberley on Monday 20 July 1891. From there he played in four of the next six games though missing the First Test against South Africa. His last match of the tour was against a King William's Town & District team, played on 6 August, despite there being a further 11 matches remaining.

On returning to Britain Jackson continued playing rugby, but between 1891 and 1894, switched from Gloucester to Halifax, who were at the time still a rugby union club. It was while representing Halifax that Jackson was selected for his one and only appearance for the England national team. Played away against Scotland, Jackson was brought into the England team for the last match of the 1894 Home Nations Championship, but after playing in the pack for the British Isles, was placed on the wing for England. The match ended in defeat for England, their first loss in five visits to Scotland; and the English selectors reacted by never selecting nine of the England players again, Jackson being one of them.

Rugby League
When Halifax converted from the rugby union to the rugby league code on Thursday 29 August 1895, Walter Jesse Jackson would have been approximately 25 years of age. Consequently, he became both a rugby union, and rugby league footballer for Halifax.

References

External links
Search for "Jackson" at rugbyleagueproject.org

1870 births
1958 deaths
British & Irish Lions rugby union players from England
England international rugby union players
English rugby league players
English rugby union players
Halifax R.L.F.C. players
Rugby league players from Gloucestershire
Rugby union forwards
Rugby union wings
Rugby union players from Gloucester